Howard Earl Farmer (born November 18, 1966) is a former Major League Baseball pitcher.

External links

1966 births
Living people
American expatriate baseball players in Canada
Baseball players from Gary, Indiana
Chattanooga Lookouts players
El Paso Diablos players
Indianapolis Indians players
Jackson State Tigers baseball players
Jacksonville Expos players
Jamestown Expos players
Major League Baseball pitchers
Montreal Expos players
New Orleans Zephyrs players
Ottawa Lynx players
Rockford Expos players
African-American baseball players